Karim Ojjeh (born 27 August 1965 in Geneva) is a Saudi Arabian businessman and racing driver. He is the younger brother of Mansour Ojjeh and son of Akram Ojjeh. He is a director of TAG Finance S.A. In his spare time he races in the Le Mans Series and the 24 Hours of Le Mans.

Racing career

Between 1991 and 1994, Ojjeh attended the Jim Russell Racing Driver School. He raced in Formula Palmer Audi between 2002 and 2004. He made his Le Mans Series debut in 2004 in a Ferrari 360 Modena. In 2005, he competed full-time in the series for Paul Belmondo Racing in an LMP2 Courage-AER, winning two races. Ojjeh and the team finished second in class at the 2005 24 Hours of Le Mans. Ojjeh continued racing with the team in 2006, but for 2007, he moved to Barazi-Epsilon, winning two LMS races in their Zytek. For 2008, Ojjeh competed in a Zytek 07S/2 for the Trading Performance team. In 2009, Ojjeh raced the Zytek under the G.A.C Racing Team banner, and for 2010 raced the updated Ginetta-Zytek GZ09S/2 for Team Bruichladdich.

24 Hours of Le Mans results

References

Living people
1965 births
Sportspeople from Geneva
Saudi Arabian businesspeople
Saudi Arabian racing drivers
Formula Palmer Audi drivers
European Le Mans Series drivers
24 Hours of Le Mans drivers
Blancpain Endurance Series drivers
24 Hours of Spa drivers
BMW M drivers
Greaves Motorsport drivers
Boutsen Ginion Racing drivers